Zeugodacus madhupuri is a species of fruit fly that was discovered in Madhupur National Park.

A group of researchers from Bangladesh and the United States ran research project in Bangladesh from 2013. In September 2018 they found a new species of fruit fly in Madhupur National Park. The name of the fruit fly was named after Madhupur National Park as Zeugodacus madhupuri.

References

Insects described in 2019
Dacinae
Insects of Bangladesh